Folleville may refer to several communes in France:

Folleville, Eure, in the Eure département
Folleville, Somme, in the Somme département